Aspatria railway station is a railway station serving the town of Aspatria in Cumbria, England. It is owned by Network Rail and managed by Northern Trains.

History
The station was opened by the Maryport and Carlisle Railway on 12 April 1841, although the line heading north-east to Wigton was not completed until 1845.

The station was once the junction for the branch line to Mealsgate. Passenger trains on this line began on 2 April 1866, but ceased on 22 September 1930. Complete closure of the line followed on 1 December 1952.

The station became part of the London, Midland and Scottish Railway during the Grouping of 1923, and then passed on to the London Midland Region of British Railways on nationalisation in 1948. When sectorisation was introduced in the 1980s, the station was served by Regional Railways until the privatisation of British Railways.

The station signal box was the last surviving example built by the Maryport and Carlisle company, prior to its closure and demolition in 1998.

Facilities
The station is unstaffed and has no ticket machine (though one is to be installed during 2019), so tickets must be purchased prior to travel or on the train (the main buildings are now in private residential use). Shelters are located on both platforms. Timetable posters, digital information screens and a telephone are provided to give train running information, whilst there is also public wifi access on offer. The platforms are linked by footbridge and there is step-free access to each one.

Services

During the evening, the station is served by an hourly service between Carlisle and Whitehaven. All services are operated by Northern Trains.

Rolling stock used: Class 156 Super Sprinter and Class 158 Express Sprinter

See also

 Listed buildings in Aspatria

References

Sources

 
 
 
Marshall, J. (1981) Forgotten Railways North-West England, David & Charles (Publishers) Ltd, Newton Abbott. 
 Station on navigable Ordnance Survey map

Further reading

External links
 
 

Railway stations in Cumbria
DfT Category F2 stations
Former Maryport and Carlisle Railway stations
Railway stations in Great Britain opened in 1841
Northern franchise railway stations
Aspatria